Agariste is a genus of sea snails, marine gastropod mollusks in the family Fissurellidae, the keyhole limpets.

Species
 Agariste compressa (Cantraine, 1835) †
 Agariste juliencilisi Landau & Marquet, 2003 †
 Agariste phrygium (Herbert & Kilburn, 1986)

References

 Landau B., Marquet R. & Grigis, M. (2003). The Early Pliocene Gastropoda (Mollusca) of Estepona, southern Spain. Part 1: Vetigastropoda. Palaeontos. 3: i-ii, 1-87, pl. 1-19.

External links
 Monterosato T. A. (di) (1892 (gennaio)). Note sur l'Emarginula compressa, Cantraine. Journal de Conchyliologie 40 (1): 78-81

Fissurellidae
Gastropod genera